The Geha Interchange bus stop bombing was a suicide bombing which occurred on December 25, 2003 on a bus stop at the Geha Interchange on the outskirts of Tel Aviv, Israel. Four people were killed in the attack and 16 injured. The Popular Front for the Liberation of Palestine claimed responsibility for the attack.

The attack
On Thursday, around 6:30 pm on December 25, 2003, a Palestinian suicide bomber detonated an explosive device near a bus stop at the Geha Interchange. Three Israeli soldiers and a 19-year-old woman were killed in the attack and 16 others were wounded. Two were killed instantly and a third died on the way to the hospital. The fourth victim died in the hospital several hours later.

The perpetrators
The Popular Front for the Liberation of Palestine claimed responsibility for the attack and stated that the suicide bomber was 18-year-old Saed Hanani of Beit Furik, a village in the West Bank. The attack came shortly after Israeli helicopters killed an Islamic Jihad commander and four other Palestinians in Gaza.

References

External links
Four Die In Suicide Bombing At Bus Stop Outside Tel Aviv - published on the Milwaukee Journal Sentinel on December 26, 2003

Suicide bombing in the Israeli–Palestinian conflict
December 2003 events in Asia
Attacks on bus stations
Building bombings in Israel